Khoein (Tati/) is a village in Ijrud-e Pain Rural District, Halab District, Ijrud County, Zanjan Province, Iran. At the 2006 census, its population was 132, in 57 families. People of Khoein speak Tati language. Tati is old language of Aazerbaijan.

References 

Populated places in Ijrud County